Marie Du Toit (or Marié Du Toit) is a South African film actress.

Career 

She appeared in eight films between 1962 and 1977.

Filmography

References

Further reading 

 Tomaselli, Keyan (1989). The Cinema of Apartheid — Race and Class in South African Film. Routledge (London, England; New York City, New York). .

External links 

 

Living people
Afrikaner people
South African film actresses
Year of birth missing (living people)